Lewis Rufus Hitch (July 16, 1929 – February 8, 2012) was an American professional basketball player. He was born in Griggsville, Illinois.

A 6'8" forward/center from Kansas State University, Hitch played six seasons (1951–1957) in the National Basketball Association as a member of the Minneapolis Lakers, Milwaukee Hawks, and Philadelphia Warriors. He averaged 5.0 points per game in his career and won two championships with the lakers.

He died on February 8, 2012, after an extended illness.

References

External links

1929 births
2012 deaths
American men's basketball players
Basketball players from Illinois
Centers (basketball)
Culver–Stockton Wildcats men's basketball players
Kansas State Wildcats men's basketball players
Minneapolis Lakers draft picks
Minneapolis Lakers players
Milwaukee Hawks players
People from Griggsville, Illinois
Philadelphia Warriors players
Power forwards (basketball)